Bryan Passi (born 5 August 1997) is a professional footballer who plays as a centre-back for Ligue 2 club Chamois Niortais. Born in France, he plays for the Congo national team.

Career
Passi made his professional debut for Montpellier in a 2–0 Ligue 1 loss against FC Metz on 21 January 2017. He signed his first professional contract on 14 February 2017.

On 31 August 2017, the last day of the summer transfer window, Passi joined Le Havre AC of Ligue 2 on loan for the 2017–18 season. The deal included an option for Le Havre to sign him permanently.

International career
Born in France, Passi is of Congolese descent. He was called up to the Congo national team for a set of friendlies in September 2022. He debuted with the Congo in a 3–3 friendly tie with Madagascar on 24 September 2022.

Personal life
Passi comes from a family of footballers. His paternal grandfather, Camille Passi, was a Congolese former footballer, and coach in his later career. His father, Franck Passi, is a former professional footballer who also played for Montpellier. His uncle, Gérald Passi, was also a professional footballer who played for the France national team.

Career statistics

References

External links
 
 
 
 Sofoot Profile
 

Living people
1997 births
Footballers from Marseille
Association football midfielders
Republic of the Congo footballers
Republic of the Congo international footballers
French footballers
Republic of the Congo people of French descent
French sportspeople of Republic of the Congo descent
Ligue 1 players
Ligue 2 players
Championnat National 2 players
Championnat National 3 players
Montpellier HSC players
Le Havre AC players
Chamois Niortais F.C. players